The 1956 Paris–Tours was the 50th edition of the Paris–Tours cycle race and was held on 7 October 1956. The race started in Paris and finished in Tours. The race was won by Albert Bouvet.

General classification

References

1956 in French sport
1956
1956 Challenge Desgrange-Colombo
October 1956 sports events in Europe